Perurena is a surname of Navarran Basque origin. Notable people with the surname include:

Domingo Perurena (born 1943), Spanish cyclist
José Perurena (born 1945), Spanish sprint canoer 

Basque-language surnames